The evacuation of civilians in Britain during the Second World War was designed to protect people, especially children, from the risks associated with aerial bombing of cities by moving them to areas thought to be less at risk.

Under the name "Operation Pied Piper", the effort began on 1 September 1939 and officially relocated 1.5 million people. There were further waves of official evacuation and re-evacuation from the south and east coasts in June 1940, when a seaborne invasion was expected, and from affected cities after the Blitz began in September 1940. Official evacuations also took place from the UK to other parts of the British Empire, and many non-official evacuations within and from the UK. Other mass movements of civilians included British citizens arriving from the Channel Islands, and displaced people arriving from continental Europe.

Background

The Government Evacuation Scheme was developed during the summer of 1938 by the Anderson Committee and implemented by the Ministry of Health. The country was divided into zones, classified as either "evacuation", "neutral", or "reception", with priority evacuees being moved from the major urban centres and billeted on the available private housing in more rural areas. Each zone covered roughly a third of the population, although several urban areas later bombed had not been classified for evacuation.

In early 1939, the reception areas compiled lists of available housing. Space was found for about 2,000 people, and the government also constructed camps that provided a few thousand additional spaces.

The government began to publicise its plan through the local authorities in summer 1939. The government had overestimated demand: only half of all school-aged children were moved from the urban areas instead of the expected 80%. There was enormous regional variation: as few as 15% of the children were evacuated from some urban areas, while over 60% of children were evacuated from Manchester, Belfast and Liverpool. The refusal of the central government to spend large sums on preparation also reduced the effectiveness of the plan. In the event, over 3,000,000 people were evacuated.

Evacuation

Almost 3.75 million people were displaced, with around a third of the entire population experiencing some effects of the evacuation. In the first three days of official evacuation, 1.5 million people were moved: 827,000 children of school age; 524,000 mothers and young children (under 5); 13,000 pregnant women; 70,000 disabled people and over 103,000 teachers and other 'helpers'. Children were parted from their parents.

Goods as well as people were evacuated; organisations or departments departed the cities. Art treasures were sent to distant storage: The National Gallery collection spent the war at the Manod Quarry near Ffestiniog, North Wales. The Bank of England moved to the small town of Overton, Hampshire and in 1939–40 moved 2,154 tons of gold to the vaults of the Bank of Canada in Ottawa. The BBC moved variety production to Bristol and Bedford and moved senior staff to Wood Norton near Evesham, Worcestershire. Many senior Post Office staff were relocated to Harrogate. Some private companies moved head offices or their most vital records to comparative safety away from major cities.

Government functions were also evacuated. Under "Plan Yellow", some 23,000 civil servants and their paperwork were dispatched to available hotels in the better coastal resorts and spa towns. Other hotels were requisitioned and emptied for a possible last-ditch "Black Move" should London be destroyed or threatened by invasion. Under this plan, the nucleus of government would relocate to the West Midlands—the War Cabinet and ministers would move to Hindlip Hall, Bevere House and Malvern College near Worcester and Parliament to Stratford-upon-Avon. Winston Churchill was to relocate to Spetchley Park whilst King George VI and other members of the royal family would take up residence at Madresfield Court near Malvern.

Some strained areas took the children into local schools by adopting the First World War expedient of "double shift education"—taking twice as long but also doubling the number taught. The movement of teachers also meant that almost a million children staying home had no source of education.

Evacuation centres

In 1939 the British Government passed the Camps Act 1939 which established the National Camps Corporation as a body to design and build residential camps for young people, which could provide opportunities for outdoor learning and also act as evacuation centres in the event of war. The architect T. S. Tait was responsible for the design of the buildings, which included accommodation for over 200 children and staff, recreational halls, wash blocks and a dining hall/kitchen complex. These camps were replicated in over thirty different rural locations around the country.

During the war years, they acted as safe refuges for city children. After the war the ownership of the sites was transferred to the local authorities. Over the years most of these sites have been lost, but the best preserved example today is Sayers Croft at Ewhurst, Surrey. The dining hall and kitchen complex is protected as a Grade II listed building because of the importance of Tait's work, and because of the painted murals depicting the life of the many evacuees. Evacuation Centres were also set up by the Foster Parent Plan (FPP) for Children Affected by War, later renamed Plan International.

One evacuated school was sponsored by the FPP in Knutsford, Cheshire, with each child being financially supported by an American citizen. One female pupil, named Paulette, was sponsored by Mrs Eleanor Roosevelt.

Overseas evacuation
The Children's Overseas Reception Board (CORB) approved 24,000 children for evacuation overseas. Between March and September 1940, 1,532 children were evacuated to Canada, mainly through the Pier 21 immigration terminal; 577 to Australia; 353 to South Africa and 202 to New Zealand. However, in 1940 and 1941 about 14,000 children were evacuated privately to overseas relatives or foster families, including 6,000 to Canada and 5,000 to the United States.

The BBC cooperated with radio networks in the host countries, to make Children Calling Home, a programme which enabled the evacuated children and their parents to talk to each other, live on air.

Other evacuations

A second evacuation effort started during and after the fall of France. From 13 to 18 June 1940, around 100,000 children were evacuated (and in many cases re-evacuated). Efforts were made to remove the vulnerable from coastal towns in southern and eastern England facing German-controlled areas. By July, over 200,000 children had been moved; some towns in Kent and East Anglia evacuated over 40% of the population. Also, some 30,000 people arrived from continental Europe and from 20 to 24 June 25,000 people arrived from the Channel Islands.

As thousands of Guernsey school children arrived in northern England with their teachers, some were allowed to re-establish their schools in empty buildings. Guernsey's Forest School reopened in a church hall in Cheadle Hulme, Cheshire where it operated until August 1945. As a result of the evacuation of so many Guernsey people to England, those returning no longer spoke the Guernsey language (Guernsiaise) after the war.

One of the speediest moves was accomplished by the London, Midland and Scottish Railway when it transferred its headquarters out of London. The company took over The Grove, on the estate of the Earl of Clarendon in Hertfordshire. This was made ready as offices and a number of huts built in the surrounding park. On 1 September 1939, it was decided to move in and the transfer was completed before war was declared two days later. Within three days some 3,000 of the staff were based at the new headquarters.

When the Blitz began in September 1940, there were clear grounds for evacuation. Free travel and billeting allowance were offered to those who made private arrangements. They were also given to children, the elderly, the disabled, pregnant women, the ill and those who had lost their homes (some 250,000 in the first six weeks in London). By the combination of all the state and private efforts, London's population was reduced by almost 25%.

As bombing affected more towns, "assisted private evacuation" was extended. However, not all evacuated children, mothers and teachers were safe in the areas to which they had been evacuated. Air raids, unexploded bombs, military vehicles and military minefields posed risks to the evacuees wherever they were posted in the UK.

London proved resilient to bombing despite the heavy bombardment. The destruction in the smaller towns was more likely to provoke panic and spontaneous evacuations. The number of official evacuees rose to a peak of 1.37 million by February 1941. By September, it stood at just over one million. By the end of 1943, there were just 350,000 people officially billeted. Still, the V-1 flying bomb attacks from June 1944 provoked another significant exodus from London. Up to 1.5 million people left by September – only 20% were "official" evacuees.

From September 1944, the evacuation process was officially halted and reversed for most areas except for London and the east coast. Returning to London was not officially approved until June 1945. In March 1946, the billeting scheme was ended, with 38,000 people still without homes.

Traumatic effect on children
Even at the time, there were some that had grave concerns about the psychological effect on especially the younger children, and wondered whether they would be better off taking the risks with their parents.

In the early 2000s a number of evacuees came forward to clarify the many "bad sides" of the evacuation.

Cultural impact

The movement of urban children of all classes to unfamiliar rural locations, without their parents, had a major impact. The Evacuees Reunion Association was formed with the support of the Imperial War Museum. It provides opportunities for former evacuees to contribute and share evacuation experiences and for researchers to request information such as the long-term effects of evacuation upon children.

The evacuation spawned a whole literature of children's and young adult fiction. The convenience of the setting for the writer is clear, allowing the child heroes to have adventures in a strange, new world. Some of the authors, like Nina Bawden, had themselves experienced evacuation.

Kitty Barne's Carnegie Medal-winning Visitors from London (1940) is an early novel about evacuees, set in Sussex.
In Richmal Crompton's William and the Evacuees (1940), William Brown is envious of the special treats the evacuees receive and organizes an 'evacuation' of the village children.
In C. S. Lewis's novel The Lion, the Witch and the Wardrobe (1950) the Pevensie children are evacuated from London to the stately manor that contains the wardrobe portal to Narnia. It is never stated in which part of England the house was situated.
William Golding's novel Lord of the Flies (1954) is about a planeful of evacuating children who are shot down over a tropical island.
Michael Bond's beloved children's book character Paddington Bear (1958) is an anthropomorphised orphan bear, who – having stowed away from "Darkest Peru" – is found by a family at Paddington railway station in London, sitting on his suitcase with a note attached to his coat that reads, "Please look after this bear. Thank you." Bond has said that his memories of newsreels showing trainloads of child evacuees leaving London during WWII, with labels around their necks and their possessions in small suitcases, prompted him to do the same for Paddington.
Nina Bawden's novel Carrie's War (1973) is about Carrie and Nick, who encounter different religions when they are evacuated to Wales.
Noel Streatfeild's novel When the Sirens Wailed (1974) is about three evacuees and covers issues like rations for evacuees, relationship between evacuees and townspeople, and the problems encountered by those who stayed behind.
Michael Morpurgo's novel Friend or Foe (1977) is about two evacuees who befriend the crew of a crashed German bomber hiding on Dartmoor.
 Diana Wynne Jones's novel A Tale of Time City (1987) begins with the main character, Vivian, being evacuated from London. Jones herself was evacuated to Wales in 1939.
Michelle Magorian's novel, Goodnight Mister Tom (1981), tells the story of the evacuee Willie Beech and elderly Thomas Oakley with whom he is billeted. It was made into a TV film starring John Thaw as Mr Tom.
In the Disney sequel to Peter Pan, Return to Neverland, Wendy Darling's children Jane and Daniel are to prepare for evacuation before Jane is kidnapped by Captain Hook. The introduction to the movie details about the evacuation order and how children need Peter Pan now more than ever.
Kit Pearson's Guests of War trilogy, beginning with The Sky Is Falling (1989), chronicles the story of ten-year-old Norah Stoakes and her younger brother Gavin, who are evacuated to Toronto.
In the 2015 videogame We Happy Few, set in an alternate reality where Germany successfully invaded and occupied Britain during the war, the main character Arthur Hastings betrays his autistic brother Percival giving him up to the collaborationist authorities in order to be sent to Germany.

Novels for adults featuring evacuation and evacuees are:

Put Out More Flags by Evelyn Waugh, in which Waugh's anti-hero Basil Seal uses his position as Billeting Officer to extort bribes (for moving disruptive children elsewhere) from hapless and reluctant hosts.
Noel Streatfeild's adult novel Saplings (1945). 
Connie Willis's two-volume novel Blackout/All Clear (2010) has extensive chapters about a time travelling character from the future, a historian named Merope (she takes on the persona of Eileen O'Reilly, an Irish maid), who intends to study the impact of evacuation on the children. When she becomes stranded in the past, she eventually adopts two bratty children to raise herself.

Non-fiction:

Out of Harm's Way by Jessica Mann (Headline Publishers 2005) tells the story of the overseas evacuation of children from Britain during the Second World War.
In Pam Hobbs's memoir Don't Forget to Write: the true story of an evacuee and her family (2009), a 10-year-old is evacuated in 1940 from Leigh-on-Sea, Essex to Derbyshire, where she lives with a number of families and encounters a range of receptions from love to outright hostility – and enormous cultural differences.
Alan Derek Clifton published his memories of being evacuated to Northern Rhodesia in 1940 in the book entitled, From Cockney to Colonial (And Back Again) (2010).
Ben Wicks's No Time to Wave Goodbye and The Day They Took the Children.
Britain's Wartime Evacuees by Gillian Mawson Gillian Mawson (Pen and Sword, 2016) shares the personal testimony of child and adult evacuees in Britain during the Second World War
Guernsey Evacuees by Gillian Mawson (History Press, 2012) shares the personal testimony of Guernsey evacuees in Britain during the Second World War

Other:

In the 20th Century Fox movie On the Sunny Side (1942), Roddy McDowall portrays an evacuated English boy who comes to live with an American family in Ohio.
Stephen Poliakoff's television drama Perfect Strangers (2001) includes a lengthy flashback of two evacuated sisters who leave the family they are sent to and live as wild children in the woods for the remainder of the war.
In the movie Bedknobs and Broomsticks (1971), the evacuated children are taken in by a good witch-in-training.
In the movie The Woman in Black 2: Angel of Death (2014), the major plot of the film involves a headmistress and a teacher evacuating a group of children out of London. One of the children lost his parents in a Blitz.

See also
 London in World War II
 Battle of Britain
 British anti-invasion preparations of the Second World War
 Trekking during the Blitz
 Evacuations of children in Germany during World War II
 Evacuations of civilians in Japan during World War II
 Evacuation in the Soviet Union
 Kindertransport
 Evacuation of civilians from the Channel Islands in 1940
 Q Camp: experimental children's community

References

Further reading
 Baumel, Judith Tydor. "Twice a Refugee: The Jewish Refugee Children in Great Britain during Evacuation, 1939--1943" Jewish Social Studies (1983) 45#2 pp175–184. 
 Crosby, Travis L. Impact of Civilian Evacuation in the Second World War (1986) 176p.
 Jackson, Carlton. Who Will Take Our Children? (1985), 217p.

 Gartner, Niko. "Administering'Operation Pied Piper'-how the London County Council prepared for the evacuation of its schoolchildren 1938-1939." Journal of Educational Administration & History 42#1 (2010): 17–32.
 Kushner, Tony."Horns and Dilemmas: Jewish Evacuees in Britain during the Second World War." Immigrants & Minorities (1988) 7#3 pp 273–291. 
 Macnicol, John. "The effect of the evacuation of schoolchildren on official attitudes to state intervention." in Harold L. Smith, ed., War and Social Change: British Society in the Second World War (1986): 3-31.
 Mawson, Gillian. Britain's Wartime Evacuees: The People, Places and Stories of the Evacuation Told Through the Accounts of Those Who Were There.: 117–130. Pen and Sword. December 2016  

Parsons Martin (ed) Children. The Invisible Victims of War. DSM Oct 2008 
Parsons Martin War Child. Children Caught in Conflict. (History Press, 2008) 
Parsons Martin  Manchester Evacuation. The Exception to the Rule. DSM publishing. April 2004  
Parsons Martin  'I’ll take that one!’  Dispelling the Myths of Civilian Evacuation in the UK during World War Two. 290pp (Beckett Karlson, 1998). . 
Parsons Martin  Waiting to go home! (Beckett Karlson, 1999). 
Parsons M & Starns P.  The Evacuation. The true Story (1999, DSM & BBC). 
 Preston, A. M. '"The Evacuation of Schoolchildren from Newcastle Upon Tyne, 1939-1942: An Assessment of the Factors which Influenced the Nature of Educational Provision in Newcastle and its Reception Areas," History of Education (1989) 18#3 pp 231–241. 11p.
 Titmuss, Richard. Problems of Social Policy  (1950) famous social science study of the evacuation. online free
 Wicks, Ben. No Time to Wave Goodbye (1989), 240p.

External links

 BBC
 BBC People's War – Yvonne Devereux 'Evacuated to Canada'
 How We Lived Then – extract from Norman Longmate book
 CLUTCH Club
 History Learning Site
 Lecture transcript on Operation Pied Piper, 31 May 2006
 The Evacuees Reunion Association
 Watch the documentary Children from Overseas online
 Operation Pied Piper

Battle of Britain
The Blitz
Evacuations
Politics of World War II
United Kingdom home front during World War II